Dudleya cultrata is a species of perennial succulent in the family Crassulaceae commonly known as the knife-leaved liveforever or the maritime succulent liveforever. This species is characterized by oblong, narrow green leaves and flowers with pale yellow petals that bloom from April to June. Although similar to Dudleya ingens, this species is most often seen growing sympatric with the larger, wax-covered Dudleya anthonyi. It is native to Baja California, occurring on the coast from Punta Colonet and San Quintin to El Rosario.

Description 
Like most other evergreen Dudleya, this species grows as a leaf succulent with a basal rosette of leaves on top of a caudex. This species branches dichotomously, giving multiple rosettes in orders of 2. This species has noticeably less leaves than the coastal form of Dudleya ingens, having only up to 25 leaves, and is similar in appearance to the inland form of Dudleya ingens. The leaves are green, and lack any glaucousness or wax. The flowers have pale-yellow to yellow petals that appear from April to June. Like other members of the subgenus Dudleya, the petals are connate, forming a tube.

Morphology 
The leaves are shaped oblong, with the sides parallel or tapering from the base. The margins are acute in the lower fourth of the leaf, but rounded above, the apex sub-terete.

The floral stem is bare of these leaves in the lower . The inflorescence consists of about 3 ascending branches, which may in turn rebranch once.

The anthers are orange. The carpels are erect.

Taxonomy 
This species bears a close resemblance to the inland form of Dudleya ingens, differing in its coastal habit and more yellowish flowers. It is a tetraploid relative to the basic chromosome number of the genus, with a gametic chromosome count of n=34.

Distribution and habitat 
Dudleya cultrata is typically found abundantly on the coast around San Quintin Bay in Baja California, and also on San Martin Island. Its northern range is near Colonet, and it can be found south in the El Rosario coast as well. On San Martin, D. cultrata hybridizes with D. anthonyi.

Gallery

References 

cultrata
Flora of Baja California
Taxa named by Joseph Nelson Rose
Natural history of the California chaparral and woodlands
Plants described in 1903
Endemic flora of Mexico